Nogometni klub Cerknica, commonly referred to as NK Cerknica or simply Cerknica, is a Slovenian football club from Cerknica, which currently plays in the Littoral League, the fourth level of the Slovenian football system. Cerknica was established in 1926.

Honours
Littoral League (fourth tier)
 Winners: 2003–04, 2012–13

References

External links
Official website 

Football clubs in Slovenia
Association football clubs established in 1926
1926 establishments in Slovenia